Case Sensitive is a British crime drama series broadcast on ITV, based on the best-selling books by Sophie Hannah. Two series of the programme, starring Olivia Williams and Darren Boyd, have been produced, adapting the novels The Point of Rescue and The Other Half Lives. The first episode was broadcast on 2 May 2011. Both series were issued on DVD on 16 July 2012.

Plot
The first series focuses on DS Charlie Zailer (Olivia Williams) and DC Simon Waterhouse (Darren Boyd) as they investigate the double murder of a mother and their five-year-old child. This series was based on the novel The Point of Rescue.  Guest stars in this series include Rupert Graves, Amy Beth Hayes and Christina Chong. Episode one drew a strong overnight viewing audience of 5.4 million viewers.

Series two involves the team dealing with the murder of a man who recently admitted to abusing a former girlfriend. This series was based on the novel The Other Half Lives. The main cast of Williams, Boyd, Wight and Ineson all returned for this series. Viewing figures were once again strong, drawing a similar audience to series one.

Cast
 Olivia Williams as DS Charlie Zailer
 Darren Boyd as DC Simon Waterhouse
 Peter Wight as DI Robbie Proust
 Ralph Ineson as DC Colin Sellers
 Christina Chong as DC Amber Williams

Episode list

Series 1 (2011)

Series 2 (2012)

References

External links
 

2011 British television series debuts
2012 British television series endings
2010s British drama television series
ITV television dramas
2010s British television miniseries
English-language television shows
Television series produced at Pinewood Studios
Television shows set in London
British detective television series